Log5 is a method of estimating the probability that team A will win a game against team B, based on the odds ratio between the estimated winning probability of Team A and Team B against a larger set of teams.

Let  and  be the average winning probabilities of team A and B and let  be the probability of team A winning over team B, then we have the following odds ratio equation

One can then solve 

The name Log5 is due to Bill James but the method of using odds ratios in this way dates back much farther. This is in effect a logistic rating model and is therefore equivalent to the Bradley–Terry model used for paired comparisons, the Elo rating system used in chess and the Rasch model used in the analysis of categorical data.

A few notable properties exist:
If , Log5 will always give A a 100% chance of victory.
If , Log5 will always give A a 0% chance of victory.
If , Log5 will always return a 50% chance of victory for either team.
If , Log5 will give A a  probability of victory.

Additional Applications 
In addition to head-to-head winning probability, a general formula can be applied to calculate head-to-head probability of outcomes such as batting average in baseball.

Sticking with our batting average example, let  be the batter's batting average (probability of getting a hit), and let be the pitcher's batting average against (probability of allowing a hit). Let  be the league-wide batting average (probability of anyone getting a hit) and let  be the probability of batter B getting a hit against pitcher P.

Or, simplified as

References

Bill James
Baseball terminology
Baseball statistics
Sports records and statistics